The Greek women's handball championship known as A1 Ethniki Women's Handball is an annual competition, the most important in Greek women's handball together with the Greek Cup. The competition is organised by the Hellenic Handball Federation since 1981. The first champion was Aris Nikaias in 1982. Anagennisi Artas holds the record of most titles won with 12 consecutive titles from 1995 to 2006. Ormi Patras broke that tradition with its title in 2007. The current title holder is PAOK Thessaloniki with 3 titles in total.

List of champions

Titles by team

References

Sportime, Greek sports website,
 Greek handball federation's official website,

External links
handball.org.gr

Handball competitions in Greece
Handball
Handball
Recurring sporting events established in 1981
1981 establishments in Greece
Professional sports leagues in Greece